Johnny O. may refer to:

Johnny O, singer
Johnny-O, nickname of John "Scottie" Ferguson in Vertigo (film)